Afghanistan–Israel relations refer to the bilateral ties between Afghanistan and the State of Israel. The two countries have never had formal diplomatic relations, and Afghanistan has never recognized Israel since the latter's independence in 1948. Zablon Simintov, who lived in Kabul and managed Afghanistan's only remaining synagogue, was thought to be the last Jew still living in Afghanistan. However, shortly after the 2021 Taliban offensive, it was discovered that his lost relative, Tova Moradi, was actually the last Jew in Afghanistan after Israeli businessman Mordechai Kahana arranged for Simintov's evacuation to Israel on 7 September 2021; Moradi also made aliyah to Israel on 29 October 2021. Simintov's desire to leave Afghanistan stemmed from his concerns over possibly being attacked by more radical Islamist terrorist groups such as the Islamic State – KP rather than the Taliban.

History
In the 1980s, Israel cooperated with the United States, Pakistan, Saudi Arabia, and other countries as part of Operation Cyclone, where it indirectly provided armaments to the Afghan mujahideen, who were fighting the Soviet-backed Afghan government as well as the Soviet Union itself. Thousands of mujahideen fighters, particularly from the Hezb-e Islami militia of Gulbuddin Hekmatyar, were reportedly trained by Israeli military instructors. Akhtar Abdur Rahman, the then-head of Pakistan's Inter-Services Intelligence, allegedly allowed Israeli personnel into Pakistan during this time.

Historically, Afghan royals have proclaimed an origin story that claims that their ancestor is the prominent Hebrew patriarch, Jacob. There are also origin theories among some Pashtun tribes that claim their descent from Saul, the first monarch of the United Kingdom of Israel.

In a 2005 interview in Kabul with a reporter from the Israeli newspaper Yedioth Ahronoth, former Afghan president Hamid Karzai hinted at a desire to establish formal ties with Israel, stating: "when there is further progress [in the Middle East peace process], and the Palestinians begin to get a state of their own, Afghanistan will be glad to have full relations with Israel." He also revealed that he had met Israeli politician Shimon Peres several times, and called him a "dear man, a real warrior for peace."

With regards to international relations after the Taliban seizure of Afghanistan in 2021, Taliban spokesperson Suhail Shaheen told the Russian news agency Sputnik: "Of course, we won't have any relations with Israel. We want to have relations with other countries; Israel is not among these countries. We would like to have relations with all the regional countries and neighbouring countries as well as Asian countries."

See also
 Foreign relations of Afghanistan
 Foreign relations of Israel
 History of the Jews in Afghanistan

References

 
Israel
Bilateral relations of Israel